Sejdo Bajramović (7 July 1927 – 1993) was a Yugoslav soldier and politician of the former Yugoslavia, who was the acting head of state of Yugoslavia for a brief time in 1991.

Born in Kosovska Kamenica, Bajramović was elected as Member of the Presidency representing Kosovo, when the Serbian president Slobodan Milošević out-manoeuvred the incumbent Riza Sapunxhiu, through a recall by the Serbian Parliament. In the same move, he also became acting head of state (Coordinator of the Presidency) of Yugoslavia, as Milošević initially refused to accept the President-designate Stipe Mesić, representing Croatia, and unilaterally declared the presidency incapable of functioning.

As the provincial legislature of Kosovo was suspended, Bajramović was appointed as presidency member by the Assembly of the Republic of Serbia. His unquestioned loyalty to Milošević and obvious lack of a democratic mandate in difference to the rest of the Presidency, made him remembered as a mere puppet for the Milošević administration and his name became synonymous with "quisling", "proxy" and "false alibi".

Bajramović's only merit before being handpicked by Milošević to vote on behalf of Kosovo, was being a sergeant first class in the Yugoslav People's Army.

Bibliography 
Viktor Meier, Yugoslavia - A History of its Demise. London: Routledge, 1999
Stipe Mesić, The Demise of Yugoslavia - A Political Memoir. Central European University Press, 2004

References

1927 births
1993 deaths
Presidents of the Socialist Federal Republic of Yugoslavia
Kosovan politicians
Kosovan soldiers
Yugoslav People's Army personnel
Serbia and Montenegro politicians
Socialist Party of Serbia politicians
Yugoslav Albanians